Courtney Caeser Hall (August 26, 1968 – April 29, 2021) was an American professional football player who was a center and guard in the National Football League (NFL) for the San Diego Chargers and spent the 1998 preseason with the Denver Broncos although he never officially suited up for the Broncos and thus couldn't be considered a part of their Super Bowl championship roster.  He was a four-time Pro Bowl first alternate and captained the only Chargers football team to play in a Super Bowl. Hall's death was announced on April 30, 2021.

Hall played football at Banning High School in Wilmington, California, and was the starting offensive tackle his junior and senior years.  His teammates included Jamelle Holieway, Leroy Holt, and Mark Tucker.  He retired from the NFL in 1997.

In 1985, aged 16, Courtney, a National Merit Scholarship semifinalist, graduated from high school and enrolled at Rice University.  He graduated in 1990 with a dual degree in Economics and Managerial Studies.  In 2003, he graduated with a joint J.D./M.B.A. degree from the University of Chicago Law School and the University of Chicago Booth School of Business.  Hall also served on the Rice University Investment Committee, helping to manage the university's $4.5 billion endowment.

Hall was a managing partner of Hillcrest Venture Partners, a venture capital firm.  He also served as New York City Mayor Michael Bloomberg's appointee to the New York City Campaign Finance Board.

The Texas Sports Hall of Fame inducted Hall into the Southwest Conference Hall of Fame in 2019.

References

External links
Profile at NFL.com

1968 births
2021 deaths
American football centers
American football offensive guards
Players of American football from Los Angeles
Rice Owls football players
San Diego Chargers players
University of Chicago Law School alumni
University of Chicago Booth School of Business alumni
African-American players of American football
Ed Block Courage Award recipients